The Children of the Abbey is a novel by the Irish romantic novelist Regina Maria Roche.  It first appeared in 1796, in London in 4 volumes, and related the tale of Amanda and Oscar Fitzalan, two siblings robbed of their rightful inheritance by a forged will. The book contains many standard Gothic elements (old mansions, a haunted abbey) in the context of a sentimental novel.

Roche's third novel, it was a major commercial success, remaining in print for most of the 19th century.

The Children of the Abbey was mentioned in Jane Austen's popular novel Emma, in Emily Climbs by L. M. Montgomery, and in 'Arabella' by Georgette Heyer. It is also referenced in the artículo costumbrista "El casarse pronto y mal" by the Spanish Romantic Mariano José de Larra, 1832. American essayist and Unitarian divine Samuel McChord Crothers portrayed The Children of the Abbey as having given rise to "a regiment of Amandas named after the best seller of the day" around the year 1800.

References

External links
 
 

1796 novels
Irish Gothic novels
18th-century Irish novels